Glutaconyl-CoA is an intermediate in the metabolism of lysine. It is an organic compound containing a coenzyme substructure, which classifies it as a fatty ester lipid molecule. Being a lipid makes the molecule hydrophobic, which makes it insoluble in water. The molecule has a molecular formula of C26H40N7O19P3S, and a molecular weight 879.62 grams per mole.

See also
 Glutaconate CoA-transferase
 Glutaconyl-CoA decarboxylase

References 

Thioesters of coenzyme A